|}

The Prestige Stakes is a Group 3 flat horse race in Great Britain open to two-year-old fillies. It is run at Goodwood over a distance of 7 furlongs (1,408 metres), and it is scheduled to take place each year in late August.

History
The event was established in 1974, and it was initially called the Globtik Stakes. It became known as the Waterford Candelabra Stakes in 1975. For a period it was classed at Listed level, and it was promoted to Group 3 status in 1981. It was given its present title in 1989.

The leading horses from the Prestige Stakes often go on to compete in the Fillies' Mile. The last to win both was Nannina in 2005.

Records
Leading jockey (4 wins):
 Pat Eddery – One Over Parr (1974), Fairy Footsteps (1980), Stratospheric (1981), Musicale (1991)

Leading trainer (6 wins):
 Henry Cecil – Cappuccilli (1975), Formulate (1978), Fairy Footsteps (1980), Moon Cactus (1989), Musicale (1991), Midnight Line (1997)

Winners

 The 1979 running took place at Ascot.

See also
 Horse racing in Great Britain
 List of British flat horse races
 Recurring sporting events established in 1974  – this race is included under its original title, Globtik Stakes.

References
 Racing Post:

 galopp-sieger.de – Prestige Stakes.
 horseracingintfed.com – International Federation of Horseracing Authorities – Prestige Stakes (2018).
 pedigreequery.com – Prestige Stakes – Goodwood.
 

Flat races in Great Britain
Goodwood Racecourse
Flat horse races for two-year-old fillies
1974 establishments in England
Recurring sporting events established in 1974